Coprosma pumila is an evergreen shrub found in Australia and New Zealand.

References
 PFAF entry
 The Plant List entry

pumila
Taxa named by Joseph Dalton Hooker